Megumi Kaneko (born 27 February 1978) is a Japanese politician. She served as a member of the House of Representatives for the Liberal Democratic Party (LDP) between 2012 and 2017, when she represented the 4th District of Niigata prefecture. She was defeated in the 2017 general election.

Biography
Born in the village of Tsukigata (now part of the city of Niigata), Kaneko was educated at Waseda University. She became a councilor for the Niigata City Council and then a member of the Niigata Prefectural Assembly. She was elected to the House of Representatives in the 2012 general elections, defeating the incumbent representative Makiko Kikuta of the Democratic Party of Japan. She was re-elected in the 2014 elections.

Kaneko is married to Kensuke Miyazaki, who served as an LDP representative for Kyoto until resigning in 2016 after it was revealed that he had an affair whilst Kaneko was pregnant. Her husband's affair was believed to have caused damage to her reputation among her constituents, leading to her defeat in 2017.

References

External links
Official website

1978 births
Living people
People from Niigata (city)
Waseda University alumni
Liberal Democratic Party (Japan) politicians
Female members of the House of Representatives (Japan)
Members of the House of Representatives (Japan)